Babino Selo (Cyrillic: Бабино Село) is a village in the municipality of Donji Vakuf, Bosnia and Herzegovina.

Demographics 
According to the 2013 census, its population was 0, down from 67 in 1991.

References

Populated places in Donji Vakuf